Mark Giles Davis (born June 8, 1963) is an American former professional basketball player. He is a 6'6" (1.98 m) and 195 lb (88 kg).

He was a small forward and he attended Great Bridge High School in Chesapeake, Virginia, where he was born. He played collegiately at Old Dominion University.

Davis was selected with the 9th pick of the fourth round of the 1985 NBA draft by the Cleveland Cavaliers. In his only NBA season (1988–89) in which he spent time with the Milwaukee Bucks (31 games) and Phoenix Suns (2 games), he averaged 3.8 points and 1.1 rebounds per game.

He won the Spanish Cup in 1990, playing for CB Zaragoza. He also played in 1991 European Cup Winner's Cup final.

One of Davis’s sons, Johnny, was drafted 10th overall in the 2022 NBA draft and currently plays for the Washington Wizards. Mark’s other son, Jordan, plays college basketball for the Wisconsin Badgers.

References

External links
basketpedya.com
nba.com/historical/playerfile
Mark Davis NBA stats, basketballreference.com

1963 births
Living people
American expatriate basketball people in Argentina
American expatriate basketball people in Belgium
American expatriate basketball people in Italy
American expatriate basketball people in Japan
American expatriate basketball people in Spain
American expatriate basketball people in Switzerland
American men's basketball players
Basketball players from Virginia
CB Zaragoza players
Cleveland Cavaliers draft picks
La Crosse Catbirds players
Liga ACB players
Lugano Tigers players
Milwaukee Bucks players
Niigata Albirex BB players
Nuova Pallacanestro Gorizia players
Old Dominion Monarchs men's basketball players
Pallacanestro Virtus Roma players
Pensacola Tornados (1985–86) players
Phoenix Suns players
Small forwards
Sportspeople from Chesapeake, Virginia